Erucaria is a genus of flowering plants of the family Brassicaceae, commonly known as Pink-mustard. It contains the following species:

 Erucaria bornmuelleri 
 Erucaria cakiloidea 
 Erucaria crassifolia 
 Erucaria erucarioides 
 Erucaria hispanica 
 Erucaria microcarpa 
 Erucaria ollivieri 
 Erucaria pinnata 
 Erucaria rostrata 
 Erucaria uncata

References

See also 
 

Brassicaceae genera
Brassicaceae